John Glover Castles (January 1, 1925 – June 18, 2001) was a United States Army major general and former Adjutant General of Virginia.

Born in East Orange, New Jersey, Castles graduated from the Valley Forge Military Academy in 1943. He enlisted in the U.S. Army in May 1943 and was commissioned in 1944 after completing Infantry Officer Candidate School. Castles served in combat with the 345th Infantry, 87th Infantry Division, 3rd Army in Europe during World War II.

After being discharged from active duty on April 15, 1946, Castles enrolled at the University of Virginia and earned a B.S. degree in 1950. He later completed courses at the United States Army Command and General Staff College in 1960 and 1964. Castles was confirmed as a United States Army Reserve brigadier general on February 8, 1974 and served as commander of the 116th Infantry Brigade (Separate) from 1977 to 1979. He was appointed adjutant general in August 1982 and confirmed as a major general on February 24, 1983.

References

External links

1925 births
2001 deaths
People from East Orange, New Jersey
Valley Forge Military Academy and College alumni
Military personnel from New Jersey
United States Army personnel of World War II
University of Virginia alumni
United States Army Command and General Staff College alumni
Recipients of the Meritorious Service Medal (United States)
National Guard (United States) generals
Recipients of the Legion of Merit
United States Army generals
Recipients of the Distinguished Service Medal (US Army)
Virginia National Guard personnel